The Return of Casanova is a 1992 French period drama film directed by Édouard Niermans, and based on Arthur Schnitzler's novella Casanova's Homecoming. It was entered into the 1992 Cannes Film Festival.

Plot
After many years of rambling across Europe the aging Giacomo Casanova is impoverished. He wants to return to the Republic of Venice but he doesn't dare going there directly because he was a fugitive when he left. While he tries to find a way to get a pardon he meets a young lady named Marcolina. The more he shows his affection, the more ostentatiously she rejects him. Even so he doesn't give up on her because her lover Lorenzo has grave gaming debts. In return for the required money Lorenzo tells Casanova about a looming secret rendezvous with Marcolina. Moreover he lets Casanova take his place. Undercover of the night Casanova finally seduces her. Lorenzo later feels his honour was besmirched and demands satisfaction. Casanova kills him in a duel and then goes home to Venice.

Cast
 Alain Delon as Casanova
 Fabrice Luchini as Camille
 Elsa Lunghini (as Elsa) as Marcolina 
 Wadeck Stanczak as Lorenzi
 Delia Boccardo as Amelie
 Gilles Arbona as Olivo
 Violetta Sanchez as Marquise
 Jacques Boudet as Abbé
 Philippe Leroy as the emissary 
 Alain Cuny as Marquis
 Yveline Ailhaud as the female cook
 Sarah Bertrand as the first woman
 Rachel Bizet as Marie
 Sandrine Blancke as Teresina
 Sophie Bouilloux as Lise
 Gabriel Dupont as the coachman

References

External links

1992 films
1992 drama films
Films based on works by Arthur Schnitzler
French drama films
1990s French-language films
Films about Giacomo Casanova
Films scored by Bruno Coulais
Films directed by Édouard Niermans
Films produced by Alain Delon
Films set in the 1770s
1990s French films